Ecosystem-based disaster risk reduction (Eco-DRR)  is based on disaster risk reduction (DRR) and the purpose of Eco-DRR is to prevent and reduce disasters by utilizing ecosystems. 
Eco-DRR is to maintain ecosystems and ecosystem services, to use them as buffer zones and buffers for dangerous natural phenomena, and to provide humans and local communities with functions such as food and water supply. Eco-DRR is closely related to Ecosystem-based adaptation (EbA), approaches to adapt to climate change. They all involve the management of ecosystems and their services to reduce the vulnerability of human communities to the impacts of climate change.

Evidence suggests that many ecosystems can benefit from sustainable, multi-factored strategies for Eco-DRR. However, disaster risk reduction research has tended to focus on urban areas of the Global North. More research  is needed in coastal, dryland and watershed areas and the Global South.

See also
 Climate change adaptation
 Climate change mitigation
 Disaster risk reduction
 Emergency management
 International Day for Disaster Reduction
 Natural disasters
 Nature-based solutions
 Risk management

References

Further reading 
 
 

Disaster preparedness
Sustainability and environmental management